Frederick I ( or ) (c. 1143 – 7 April 1206) was the duke of Lorraine from 1205 to his death. He was the second son of Matthias I and Bertha (also called Judith), daughter of Frederick II, Duke of Swabia. He succeeded his brother, Simon II, who had already given him the county of Bitche in 1176 and had recognised him over the northern, germanophone half of Lorraine by the Treaty of Ribemont of 1179. Judith had wanted him to succeed to all their father's inheritance, but a three-year civil war only secured him Bitche and a half-portion.

Simon retired to a monastery in 1205, recognising Frederick's son Frederick as heir.  Frederick inherited it all nevertheless, but died a year later and it went to his son by Wierzchoslawa Ludmilla (1150–1223), daughter of Mieszko III the Old, duke of Greater Poland and high duke of all Poland. Their children were:

Frederick, his successor in Lorraine
Thierry the Devil (le Diable), lord of Autigny, married Gertrude de Montmorency, daughter of Mathieu II le Grand, Constable of France.
Henry the Lombard, who built the castle of Bayon
Philip (died 1243), lord of Gerbéviller
Matthias (1170–1217), bishop of Toul
Agatha (died 1242), abbess of Remiremont
Judith, married Henry II, Count of Salm
Hediwge (died 1228), married Henry I, Count of Zweibrücken
Cunigunda (died 1214), married Waleran III of Limburg

Notes

Dukes of Lorraine
1140s births
1206 deaths
Year of birth uncertain